Noritsu Koki Co., Ltd. is a holding company with subsidiaries engaged in the development and sales of audio equipment, the manufacture and sales of pen-nib components, and healthcare for medical data analysis and research.

Overview 
Founded as a manufacturer of photo processing equipment. Until the 2000s, the mainstay of the company's business was the QSS (Quick Service System), an automatic photo development system called a "minilab" that was installed in photo studios and DPE stores (small-scale photo development shops that existed in many cities until the 2000s), and it was the largest company with a 50% share of the global market. Since the mid-1990s, Noritsu has had a partnership with Eastman Kodak, the world's largest manufacturer of photographic film, and since Noritsu did not manufacture consumer products such as film and photographic paper, Noritsu used Kodak materials and Kodak sold Noritsu products on an OEM basis.

With the spread of digital cameras, the minilab market shrank rapidly, and the company's performance substantially.

Since the late 1990s, the company has also manufactured "digital minilabs," equipment that supports digital camera printing. In 2002, the company began joint development of minilabs with Kodak, and in 2006, it formed an alliance with Fujifilm, its biggest rival in the minilab industry, to jointly develop minilabs in an attempt to survive.

However, since the late 2000s, the company has been scaling back its photography-related business.

Since 2010, the company has been actively engaged in M&A activities in other industries, and has been transforming its business by entering the healthcare business. In 2016, the company sold its founding photography-related business. (Noritsu Precision, which originated from the photo processing equipment division of the former Noritsu Koki, has the largest share of the global market for film photo processing equipment, a market that will remain professional in the 2020s.)

After announcing its mid-term management plan in 2019, the company restructured its business portfolio. Currently, as a holding company, the company focuses on the "manufacturing" business through Teibow, which has a 50% share of the global market for felt-tipped pen nibs, and AlphaTheta (formerly Pioneer DJ), a manufacturer of audio equipment known for its Pioneer DJ brand, which has a 70% share of the global market for DJ equipment, as well as the "healthcare" business through JMDC (formerly Japan Medical Data Center), a medical big data company.

History 
Mr. Kanichi Nishimoto, the founder of Nishimoto Studio, a photo studio in Wakayama City, invented a water washing machine for photographic paper in 1951, using the principle of a water wheel. The company was established in 1956 as Noritsu Koki Seisakusho to commercialize this invention. The company's name is derived from the idea of "improving the efficiency" of the photographic development process.

Since its founding, the company has offered equipment for photo stores, and has developed and manufactured equipment for black-and-white and color photo printing one after another. In 1961, with the development of the RF-20E monochrome film processor, the company succeeded in automating the monochrome film development process for the first time in the world. In the same year, the company name was changed to Noritsu Koki.

In 1976, the company developed the QSS-1, the first model of the Quick Service System (QSS), a system that integrates the processes of developing film and making prints. In the 1970s, photo development was becoming more mechanized and faster, and the expensive and time-consuming method of having skilled operators develop each sheet of film by hand ("hand-burning") was being replaced by the more common method of sending the film to a lab to be developed in batches by a large machine ("centralized lab" method). Even so, the latter method took about a week to complete, but with the introduction of the QSS, photos could be developed in about an hour in a photo studio. The QSS was the first of a series of small-scale photo developing equipment that later became known as "minilabs," and minilabs were installed in photo studios around the world.

Later, as Fujifilm and other major Japanese photographic equipment manufacturers began to develop their minilab businesses, Noritsu established Noritsu America in 1978, making it the first company in Japan to enter the North American market. In the 1980s, Noritsu achieved great success in North America and became synonymous with minilabs in the U.S., gaining the top share of the global minilab market and the company expanded rapidly, becoming listed on the First Section of the Tokyo Stock Exchange in 1997.

Until the 2000s, there were many photo development stores called "DPE stores" in Japan. A DPE store is a small store whose main business is to develop photos and order films to the labs. They were usually attached to photo material stores, but since minilabs can develop photos without requiring skilled operators, many people from other industries entered the market. DPE stores affiliated with photographic material dealers such as Fujicolor Shop installed minilabs made by their affiliated manufacturers, while other independent DPE stores often installed minilabs made by Noritsu. In the 1980s and 1990s, a system was established where a person could hand his camera over to a DPE store set up in a corner of a supermarket, and the photos would be ready when the person has finished shopping.

However, since the 2000s, the spread of digital cameras has altered the business performance of Noritsu Koki, which is mainly in the film business. In 1996, Fujifilm released the Frontier, the world's first digital minilab, and in 1998, Konica released the QD-21, the world's first digital minilab compatible with memory cards. Noritsu was right behind to the digital market, so it partnered with Kodak and released the QSS-27 series of digital minilabs equipped with the DLS (Digital Lab System) software system developed by Kodak. In 2002, Noritsu partnered with Seiko Epson to develop the "dry minilab," which prints photos using the inkjet method without using a developing solution. Despite that, the incumbent president, Kanichi Nishimoto, died in 2005 at the age of 90. Under the leadership of the second president, Noritsu Koki sought to continue the minilab business by forming an alliance with rival Fujifilm in 2006 to jointly develop a digital minilab, but the founding family (wife and daughter of Kanichi Nishimoto), Noritsu Koki's major shareholders, dismissed all directors in 2008. Thereafter, Hirotsugu Nishimoto, former secretary and son-in-law of Kanichi Nishimoto, took over as president.

Noritsu Koki had been in the red since 2006, but as of 2008, the company had no debt, retained earnings of 70.7 billion yen, and sales of 62.6 billion yen, and was thought to be the world's largest company in the minilab business. However, in reality, the minilab industry has been in a rapid decline. In 2005, Copal, which had jointly developed minilabs with Agfa, withdrew from the minilab business following the bankruptcy of Agfa in Germany; in 2006, Konica Minolta transferred its minilab business to Noritsu (and withdrew from all camera and photo businesses at the same time); in 2010 In 2010, KIS, a French company under the KIS Photo-Me group (which also had a small market share in Japan), withdrew from the minilab business, and in 2012, Kodak, which had jointly developed the minilab with Noritsu, went bankrupt. Fujifilm, Noritsu's biggest rival in the minilab business, had also scaled back its imaging business and restructured its business portfolio to focus on the healthcare business and high-functional materials. (Incidentally, Photo-Me also entered the laundromat business in 2010, and is restructuring its business portfolio while continuing its imaging business as a manufacturer of proof photos and purikura.)

Under the leadership of President Hirotsugu Nishimoto, Noritsu Koki established NK Relations in 2009 to expand into fields other than the photo processing equipment business, and developed a number of businesses unrelated to the photo processing business, including the agricultural business NK Agri. At the same time, the company downsized its photography business and separated its photography-related business from Noritsu Koki in 2011 as NK Works Co.. At the time, Noritsu had abundant funds left over from its minilab business, so Noritsu aggressively pursued M&A in different industries and acquired medical and pen-nib companies. In the fiscal year ended March 2010, Noritsu Koki posted a huge loss of 20.6 billion yen on sales of 27.9 billion yen, partly due to the impairment of the minilab business, and the company returned to profitability in the fiscal year ended March 2013.

In 2016, the company sold all of its shares in NK Works to an investment company and withdrew from the photography-related business. NK Works later changed its name to Noritsu Precision. Noritsu Precision, together with Fujifilm, was one of the last two companies to develop and sell developing machines for film photography, sharing the global market with Noritsu's QSS series and Fujifilm's Frontier series. Noritsu Precision is the last of the two companies to develop and sell film photo processing machines.

In 2015, the company relocated its headquarters from Wakayama City, the site of its original business, to Minato Ward, Tokyo. There are still some former affiliates in Wakayama City, such as Noritsu Precision Headquarters, which produces photo-related equipment. The last one, the "Camera no Nishimoto Garage-mae Honten" (Nishitakamatsu, Wakayama City) and its attached "Nishimoto Studio" closed in June 2020.

In June 2018, the current CEO, Mr.Ryukichi Iwakiri, took over as CEO, and after a round of M&A strategy, began restructuring the business portfolio. In 2018, NK Relations was merged into Noritsu Koki itself. In 2019, the company announced its mid-term management plan, setting its core businesses as "manufacturing" and "healthcare". In 2019, JMDC Group, consisting of JMDC, Doctor Net, and Uniqe Software Research, which is responsible for the healthcare business, went public.In 2020, as a manufacturing business, we acquired Alpha Theta Corporation, which owns PioneerDJ, and in 2021, as a manufacturing business, we acquired PEAG, LLC dba JLab Audio, which owns JLab, the No. 1 portable audio brand in the U.S. in the affordable price range

Chronology 

 In 1951

Founder Mr.Kanichi Nishimoto invents an automatic water rinsing machine for photographic paper.

This groundbreaking invention, which uses the principle of a waterwheel and can operate even during power outages, lays the foundation for the company.

 In 1956

Noritsu Koki Seisakusho Co. was established.

 In 1961

Reorganized as Noritsu Koki  Co., Ltd. Became the current company name.

Developed the RF-20E, an advanced automatic monochrome film processor. Succeeded in automating the film development process for the first time in the world.

 In 1976

Development of the QSS-1, the origin of the QSS minilab and the driving force behind its global expansion.

 In 1996

Listed on the Second Section of the Osaka Securities Exchange.

 In 1997

Listed on the First Section of the Tokyo Stock Exchange.

 In 2005

Founder Mr. Kanichi Nishimoto passed away.

 In 2009

Established NK Relations, Co., Ltd. (NK Relations, LLC since 2016), which is responsible for new business development and M&A.

In addition to producing vegetables at one of Japan's leading plant factories, NK AGRI,  Co., Ltd. was established with the aim of moving from "agriculture of form to agriculture of substance. (Withdrawal in 2020)

 In 2010

Doctor-NET Co., Ltd, a leading company in remote diagnostic imaging support services ("Tele-RAD®"), to the Group.

Established NK Medico Co., Ltd. to develop advanced medical technology and preventive medicine business.

 In 2011

Established NK Works Co., Ltd. to take over the imaging business through a corporate split. Noritsu Koki Co., Ltd. becomes a holding company.

 In2012

NS PARTNERS,  Co., Ltd.,which is engaged in consulting and medical fee factoring for medical institutions, to the Group.

Iki Iki  Co., Ltd(HALMEK Co., Ltd., since 2016), a publishing and mail-order business that proposes lifestyles for women in their 50s and older, will join the Group. (Transfer in 2020)

Zenkokutsuhan Co., Ltd.,  mail-order business focusing on seniors, to the Group. (Transfer in 2020)

 In 2013

Japan Medical Data Center Co., Ltd., a medical statistics data service provider, to the Group.

FEED Co., Ltd.,a mail-order business for dental clinics, to the Group. (Transfer in 2020)

Japan Regenerative Medicine Co., Ltd. to be responsible for research and development of regenerative medicine technologies and products, and cellular pharmaceuticals. (Transfer in 2020)

 In 2014

Established Health Age SAST Insurance Co., Ltd. and started to develop new insurance policies using the big data of Japan Medical Data Center, a group company.

(In 2016, the company received approval from the financial authorities and began operations)

 In 2015

Changed the head office location from Wakayama City, Wakayama Prefecture to Minato Ward, Tokyo.

Changed its institutional design from a company with a board of auditors to a company with an audit committee.

Changed its accounting standards from Japanese GAAP to International Financial Reporting Standards (IFRS).

 In 2016

Transferred NK Works Co., Ltd., (currently Noritsu Precision Co., Ltd.) which was engaged in the imaging business, the business in which the company was founded.

Health Age SAST Insurance Co., Ltd. obtains approval from financial authorities. (Transfer in 2020)

GeneTech Co., Ltd.,a fetal DNA testing service using maternal blood, to the Group. (Transfer in 2020)

Gene Techno Science  Co., Ltd.,a biopharmaceutical company, will join the Group.

Team UNIKE, including UNIKE Software Research, Co., Ltd., which develops systems for insurance pharmacies, is welcomed to the group.

 In 2017

Nihon Kyosai Co., Ltd., which operates a home contents insurance business for renters, to the Group.(Transferred in 2020)

 In 2018

Merged with NK Relations, LLC.

Mr. Ryukichi Iwakiri assumed the position of president. Began restructuring the business portfolio.

 In 2019

Soliton Corporation, a manufacturer of PBT (polybutylene terephthalate) brushes, was added to the Group.

JMDC Group, consisting of JMDC, Doctor-NET and UNIKE Software Research, is listed.

Announced mid-term management plan, defining core businesses and promoting restructuring of the business portfolio.

 In 2020

AlphaTheta (formerly known as Pioneer DJ), which produces DJ equipment such as the Pioneer DJ, will join the group.

The company will redefine its core businesses as the manufacturing business, which includes Alpha Theta and Teibow, and the healthcare business, which includes the JMDC Group, and will withdraw from all other businesses, reorganizing them into business groups with high growth potential.

 In 2021

Acquired PEAG, LLC dba JLab Audio, which owns the portable audio brand "JLab", and welcomed it to the group.

CM / Advertising 
From October 2004 to September 2005, a TV commercial featuring the TV personality Chinatsu Wakatsuki was aired on Asahi Broadcasting Corporation's "Newlyweds Welcome! TV commercial featuring the TV personality Chinatsu Wakatsuki.

References

Related items 

 Wakayama Trians A professional basketball team that competed in the NBL from 2013 to 2015. 
The team's office was housed in the head office building, and its home arena was the Wakayama head office gymnasium, which was renamed Noritsu Arena Wakayama.
 GRANDPARK  In March 2014, the company purchased a facility that was closed due to the withdrawal of stores. However, as "it will not be rebuilt as Grand Park," the facility has been dismantled since May, and the K's Denki Kofu store has been opened on the site.

External links 
 Teibow Co., Ltd. 
 soliton corporation Co., Ltd.
 AlphaTheta Co., Ltd.
 PEAG, LLC dba JLab Audio
 PreMedica Co., Ltd.
 Doctor-NET Co., Ltd.
 NS PARTNERS Co., Ltd.
 JMDC  Co., Ltd.
 UNIKE Software Research Co., Ltd.
 TEIBOW NIB MANUFACTURING (CHANG SHU) Co., LTD.

Link 

 Noritsu Koki Co., Ltd
 Noritsu Precision Co., Ltd.

Photography companies of Japan
Midori-kai
Manufacturing companies based in Tokyo
Companies listed on the Tokyo Stock Exchange
Japanese companies established in 1961
Manufacturing companies established in 1961
1997 initial public offerings
Minato, Tokyo